Głogówko may refer to the following places in Poland:
Głogówko, Lower Silesian Voivodeship (south-west Poland)
Głogówko, Greater Poland Voivodeship (west-central Poland)